Cuthand is an unincorporated community in Red River County, Texas.

History
A post office called Cuthand was established in 1867, and remained in operation until 1953. According to tradition, the name derives from a pioneer incident in which an Indian injured his hand.

References

Unincorporated communities in Red River County, Texas
Unincorporated communities in Texas